Mesquita is a municipality located in the Brazilian state of Rio de Janeiro.

The municipality contains part of the  Mendanha State Park, created in 2013. The name is a reference to the second Baron of Mesquita, Jerônimo Roberto de Mesquita, the owner of the old farms (fazendas) in the present central region of the municipality.

References

Municipalities in Rio de Janeiro (state)